Hubert Delany may refer to:
 Hubert Thomas Delany, American civil rights pioneer, lawyer, politician and judge
 Hubert Douglas Delany, his great-grandson, member of the Connecticut House of Representatives